The North Carolina Department of Transportation Ferry Division is a branch of NCDOT that is responsible for the operation of over two dozen ferry services that transport passengers and vehicles to several islands along the Outer Banks of North Carolina.

Three other inland, cable ferries — the Elwell Ferry, Parker's Ferry and Sans Souci Ferry — continue in operation, under the oversight of the North Carolina Department of Transportation.

History
Ferries have always played a vital role to the residents and visitors of Eastern North Carolina. The first ferries began in the mid-1920s when Captain J.B. "Toby" Tillett established a tug and barge service across Oregon Inlet along North Carolina's Outer Banks.

In 1934, the North Carolina Highway Commission recognized the importance of this service to residents and began subsidizing Tillett's business. These subsidies kept tolls at an affordable level. In 1942, the Highway Commission began full reimbursement to eliminate the tolls. Tillett was fully subsidized until 1950 when his business was sold to the state.

In 1947, the Commission purchased the ferry operations of T.A. Baum, who operated a route that ran across Croatan Sound and linked Manns Harbor and Roanoke Island. This became the first route of the N.C. Ferry System.

Today
The North Carolina Department of Transportation's Ferry Division extends over seven routes, one emergency route, has 22 ferries, and employs over 400 workers. The operations are supported by a full service shipyard at Manns Harbor and 10 support vessels, including dredge, military-style landing craft utility vehicles (LCUs), tugs, and barges. The Ferry Division operates over 200 sailings, with the ferries covering  each day. The system includes the world's longest fare-free ferry route.

Each year, North Carolina ferries transport nearly 1 million vehicles and more than 2 million passengers across five separate bodies of water - the Currituck and Pamlico sounds and the Cape Fear, Neuse, and Pamlico rivers.

Ferries also carry essential goods to water-locked communities. Many residents depend on the ferries for transportation to school, work, and other needed services.

Types of ferry boats

Hatteras Class

The North Carolina Ferry System operates seven Hatteras Class ferries. These Vessels draft only 4 feet, and are designed for the shallow waters and shifting shoals of Eastern North Carolina. Originally designed to carry 150 passengers, these ferries have been downrated to carry only 149 passengers with the introduction of new regulations regarding ferries capable of carrying 150 or more passengers.

River Class

The Ferry System operates ten River Class ferries. These boats are designed for heavy, abusive use, and are double-ended (except the Hunt), meaning they do not have to turn around at the docks. This feature saves time on busy river routes. River class ferries are slowly replacing the older Hatteras class ferries.

Sound Class

The North Carolina Ferry System operates five Sound Class ferries. These ferries are the largest in the system, able to carry up to 50 cars. These Ferries are designed to withstand the abuse of constantly traversing the shallow, turbulent waters of the Pamlico Sound. The M/V Pamlico has been sold to Cross Sound Ferry of New London, CT. The M/V Pamlico is the sister ship of the M/V Silver Lake.

Routes

Knotts Island - Currituck:  This route was created in the fall of 1962, and is the world's longest free ferry. It links NC 615 to the mainland, across the Currituck Sound between Knott's Island and Currituck.   This was done to shorten the travel time for Knott's Island school children to their school on the mainland.
Hatteras - Ocracoke:  Service began across Hatteras Inlet in 1953 to connect the islands of Hatteras and Ocracoke; it links NC 12.  This route is the busiest in the system, with about 1 million passengers using this crossing yearly.
Swan Quarter - Ocracoke:  The newest route in the system, service was begun across the Pamlico Sound between Swan Quarter and Ocracoke in 1977; it links NC 45.  This was done to connect residents of Ocracoke to their county seat for Hyde County.
Cedar Island - Ocracoke:   In 1961, service was begun between Cedar Island and Ocracoke to provide a connection for NC 12 to the mainland, and allow better travel to and from the Outer Banks across the Pamlico Sound. 
Bayview - Aurora:  Service to connect NC 306 across the Pamlico River began in 1966 to provide workers at the mining companies in Aurora a direct connection to their homes on the north bank of the river.
Cherry Branch - Minnesott Beach:  To complete NC 306, service began across the Neuse River in 1973.  This route is used heavily by workers at the Cherry Point Marine Corps Air Station to commute to and from their homes in Pamlico County.
Southport - Ft. Fisher:  Service began across the Cape Fear River in 1965; it links NC 211 to US 421.  This route was designed for use by tourists traveling between the attractions north and south of the mouth of the Cape Fear.

Emergency Route
Stumpy Point - Rodanthe: This is an emergency service, which provides an alternate means of connecting the north end of Hatteras Island to the mainland.  It runs only on an as-needed basis, which typically occurs after a hurricane washes out NC 12 near the Oregon Inlet.  When in operation, usually six departures from each terminal are scheduled per day, and normally only essential vehicles and local residents may use the service.  It is a 1.75-hour, fare-free, crossing.  The route connects NC 12 to US 264 West.  The Stumpy Point and Rodanthe ferry terminals were constructed in 2002 and 2001, respectively.

Tolls
The Ferry System today relies heavily on taxpayer subsidies, resulting in a one-way car toll of only $5 for the Cape Fear route and $15 for the Cedar Island and Swan Quarter routes. In recent years, the rough economy has forced the state to consider adding and increasing tolls so one-way car tolls for the Neuse River route would be $3; The Cape Fear River, Pamlico River, Currituck Sound and Hatteras routes would be $7; and the Cedar Island and Swan Quarter routes would be $25. The Department of Transportation has also considered tolling the Bonner and Dare Bridges and the legislature has created the North Carolina Turnpike Authority in an attempt to raise revenues. As of the end of the 2014 legislative session, however, it appears as though none of the ferry or bridge toll increases will take place.

References

External links

 NCDOT Ferry Division Home page
 NCDOT Cedar Island Ferry movie

Ferry companies of North Carolina
Ferries of North Carolina